As of the middle 2011, trams are one of the basic types of public transportation in the city of Odesa, Ukraine. Odesa is served by 19 regular, and 5 non-regular, tram routes. Electric trams have been operating in Odesa since 1910.

The tram network is laid along mainline streets from  the city center, serving as a convenient connection with the more outward neighborhoods of Odesa. System facts are:

 As of early 2011, Odesa has 210 Tatra T3 tramcars, 106 of them having been modernized.
 In 2006, К-1 tramcars started to be delivered. They are manufactured on Yuzhmash plant in Dnipro. There are also Tatra-Yug trams, manufactured there.
 For heritage purposes, there is one pseudo-Nivelles retro tram, which was made out of MTV-82 tram.
 The Odesa Tram Network is served by two depots. One is located near the railway station, the other is located in Slobodka (in the western part of the city). A service tram depot (located near "Tovarnaja" station) used to house some of the passenger service routes 1996, but it now houses only service trams.
 As of November 2016, the lines in vul Preobrazhenska, vul Tyraspilska, and vul Nizhynska were out of service. A new roundabout at the junction of these lines was being constructed, with excavation to a depth of 1 metre for two blocks either side in vul Preobrazhenska. At the bottom of the trench was being poured slab concrete. Track for the roundabout was being fabricated in situ from straight rails.  It is estimated that the work would take several more months.
 As of November 2016, the track in vul Novoshepnoy Ryad was in poor condition, the asphalt road surface having disappeared where it flanked the Privoz market, pointwork at vul Preobazhenska was in poor condition. Speed of trams in this street was low on account of the exposed rails, and cars and trucks travelling at walking pace over the rough surface.
 As of October 2018, the roundabout in vul Preobrazhenska was in operation, allowing trams to enter and leave in any direction along the streets mentioned previously.
 Operational difficulties plague the system.  The track and pointwork in vul Noveshepnoy and vicinity are unchanged from 2016.  Services along two routes ceased for long periods on the same day in 2018.  This is the result of three factors: One is the removal of turn-back facilities that enabled trams to service part of the route when there is a breakdown or accident (example, lines 12 and 3 near Fine Arts Museum). Another is the removal of cross links that would enable a tram to reach a destination via another route when a breakdown occurs (example, vul Stelova). The third is attributable to the continued used of single-ended trams. With a double-ended tram, a turn-back is possible wherever there is a shunt.  Single-ended trams need a loop or a turnout to a cusp, to enable the tram to travel in the opposite direction on the other track.

Route network

Additional routes 
3а 2nd station of Lustdorf Road- Tiraspolska Square.

3к 2nd station of Lustdorf Road — Railway station

Closed routes and phantom routes (after 1990) 
2  Peresyp Bridge — Railway Station
 Used in evening to supplement shortcut runs of route 3. Present of official maps
4  Zastava 2 — Shevchenko Park
 cancelled in 2005, tracks are demolished, and trolleybus # 2 runs on its way along Uspenskaya Street.
9  "Centrolit" plant — Peresyp Bridge
 cancelled in 1997, was included in routes № 1,6,7,8.
14  Isaac Rabin Street — Railway Station
 Was introduced to supplement route № 10, in 2000 was no longer needed. Used only for yard moves of Route 10 and sometimes operates during rush hour time. Present on official maps.
16 Kulikovo field - 6th station of Fountain Road

22 Slobodka market — Peresyp bridge

29 Lustdorf — 11th station of Lustdorf Road  For a long time, used to be what's now known as route 31.

30 Ivanovskiy VIaduct — Peresyp Bridge
 Closed in 2008 due to construction of the North-South auto mainline, which implied the roadway expansion. The construction of the Auto mainline was not completed due toa couple of reasons. Tram route 30 was replaced by 30A bus route. Since this route is served by 2 buses only, almost no one uses it.

References

External links 
 

Tram
Tram transport in Ukraine
Odessa